Baltika is a rural locality (a selo) and the administrative centre of Baltiysky Selsoviet, Iglinsky District, Bashkortostan, Russia. The population was 719 as of 2010. There are 13 streets.

Geography 
Baltika is located 19 km southeast of Iglino (the district's administrative centre) by road. Leninskoye is the nearest rural locality.

References 

Rural localities in Iglinsky District